Lobsang Khedrup (born 9 October 2000) is a Chinese footballer who plays as a midfielder for Hubei Istar.

Career

In 2018, Khedrup signed for Portuguese side Gondomar B. In 2021, he signed for Hubei Istar in China. On 7 July 2021, he debuted for Hubei Istar during a 0-3 loss to Guangxi Pingguo Haliao.

References

Chinese footballers
Tibetan sportspeople
Tibetan footballers
Living people
2000 births
Chinese expatriate sportspeople in Portugal
China League Two players
Hubei Istar F.C. players
Association football midfielders
Expatriate footballers in Portugal
Chinese expatriate footballers